Caso may refer to:

People
 Alexandra Caso (born 1987), Dominican volleyball player
 Alfonso Caso (1896–1970), Mexican archaeologist
 Ana de Armas Caso (born 1988), Cuban-Spanish actress
 Antonio Caso Andrade (1883–1946), Mexican philosopher
 Beatriz Caso (1929–2006), Mexican sculptor
 Carmen Rosa Caso (born 1981), Dominican volleyball player
 Domenico Caso (born 1954), Italian football coach and player
 Eduardo Morales Caso (born 1969), Cuban composer
 Giuseppe Caso (born 1998), Italian football player
 Jacques de Caso (born 1928), French-born American historian
 Javier Caso (born 1986), Mexican footballer
 José Luis Caso Cortines (1933–1997), Spanish politician, a victim of ETA
 Laurence Caso, American television producer
 Luis Videgaray Caso (born 1968), Mexican politician
 Michel De Caso (born 1956), French visual artist
 Mike Caso (born 1984), American football player
 Pere Borrell del Caso (1835–1910), Spanish painter
 Ralph G. Caso (1917–1998), American politician
 Tony Caso (fl. 1980s), American recording artist
 Vincent Caso (born 1991), American actor
 Ángeles Caso (born 1959), Spanish journalist, translator and writer

Places
 Caso, Asturias, Spain